The 1933 Tour de France was the 27th edition of the Tour de France, one of cycling's Grand Tours. The Tour began in Paris with a flat stage on 27 June, and Stage 12 occurred on 10 July with a flat stage to Marseille. The race finished in Paris on 23 July.

Stage 1
27 June 1933 – Paris to Lille,

Stage 2
28 June 1933 – Lille to Charleville,

Stage 3
29 June 1933 – Charleville to Metz,

Stage 4
30 June 1933 – Metz to Belfort,

Stage 5
1 July 1933 – Belfort to Evian,

Stage 6
3 July 1933 – Evian to Aix-les-Bains,

Stage 7
4 July 1933 – Aix-les-Bains to Grenoble,

Stage 8
5 July 1933 – Grenoble to Gap,

Stage 9
6 July 1933 – Gap to Digne,

Stage 10
7 July 1933 – Digne to Nice,

Stage 11
9 July 1933 – Nice to Cannes,

Stage 12
10 July 1933 – Cannes to Marseille,

References

1933 Tour de France
Tour de France stages